The 2022–23 Marshall Thundering Herd men's basketball team represented Marshall University during the 2022–23 NCAA Division I men's basketball season. The Thundering Herd, led by ninth-year head coach Dan D'Antoni, played their home games at the Cam Henderson Center as members of the Sun Belt Conference. They finished the season 24–8, 13–5 in Sun Belt play to finish in a tie for second place. They lost to Texas State in the quarterfinals of the Sun Belt tournament. Despite finishing with 24 wins, they did not participate in a postseason tournament.

The season marked the school's inaugural season in the Sun Belt Conference after spending the previous 17 seasons as a member of Conference USA.

Previous season
The Thundering Herd finished the season 12–21, 4–14 in C-USA play to finish in seventh place in the East Division. They defeated FIU before losing to Louisiana Tech in the second round of the C-USA tournament.

On October 30, 2021, Marshall announced they would become a member of the Sun Belt Conference. On March 29, it was announced they would officially join on July 1, 2022, making it the final season competing in C-USA.

Offseason

Departures

Incoming transfers

2022 recruiting class

Preseason

Preseason Sun Belt Conference poll 
The Thundering Herd were picked to finish in sixth place in the conference's preseason poll. Senior guard Taevion Kinsey was named to the preseason All-SBC First Team. Junior guards Andrew Taylor and Kamdyn Curfman were named to the preseason All-SBC Third Team.

Roster

Schedule and results

|-
!colspan=12 style=| Exhibition

|-
!colspan=12 style=| Non-conference regular season

|-
!colspan=9 style=| Sun Belt Conference regular season

|-
!colspan=9 style=| Sun Belt Conference Tournament

Awards and honors

References

Marshall Thundering Herd men's basketball seasons
Marshall
Marsh
Marsh